The Marcmotor ROS200 is an Italian aircraft engine, designed and produced by Marcmotor of Macerata for use in ultralight aircraft.

Design and development
The ROS200 is a twin-cylinder two-stroke, in-line,  displacement, fan-forced air-cooled, gasoline engine design, with a helical gear mechanical gearbox reduction drive with a reduction ratio of 3.5:1. It employs a single capacitor discharge ignition and produces  at 9000 rpm, with a compression ratio of 10.6.

Specifications (ROS200)

See also

References

External links

Marcmotor aircraft engines
Two-stroke aircraft piston engines
Air-cooled aircraft piston engines
2010s aircraft piston engines